Henry Hutt (1875–1950) was an American painter and illustrator born in Chicago. He was educated at the School of the Art Institute of Chicago and was a member of the class of 1892. He was also a member of the Art Students League of the Chicago Art Institute. With several fellow students he formed the Palette and Chisel, an independent artists' association in Chicago.

Among the community of popular illustrators of his time, Hutt was particularly known for his illustrations of modern, elegant women, drawn from models. His work was printed widely in the popular American press, in periodicals such as Collier's, Harper's, and The Century. His illustrations and cover art appeared in dozens of novels and non-fiction books.  A monograph was published on his work in 1898.

Exhibitions 
 Art Students League group exhibition, Art Institute of Chicago, 1895
 Exhibition of original work by Collier's illustrators, 1905–1906
 Corcoran Gallery, Washington, D.C., 1905
 American Art Gallery, New York, 1905
 Art Institute of Chicago, 1906

Selected magazine contributions

Covers 
 "The Christmas Angel", The Century Magazine, Christmas Number, 1899

Illustrations for articles and short stories 
 Edith Thomas, "The Christmas Dancers", The Century Magazine, Christmas Number, 1899 – three full-page illustrations
 Jack London, "The Game", Metropolitan, April 1905

References

External links 

  (previous page of browse report as 'Hutt, Henry, 1875–' without '1950')

American illustrators
Artists from Chicago
Painters from Illinois
School of the Art Institute of Chicago alumni
American male painters
20th-century American painters
1875 births
1950 deaths
20th-century American male artists